This is a list of singles which topped the Irish Singles Chart in 1969.

Prior to 1992, the Irish singles chart was compiled from trade shipments from the labels to record stores, rather than on consumer sales. Note that the chart release day moved from Saturday to Friday at the beginning of September.

See also
1969 in music
Irish Singles Chart
List of artists who reached number one in Ireland

1969 in Irish music
1969 record charts
1969